Leucopogon navicularis is a species of flowering plant in the heath family Ericaceae and is endemic to the southwest of Western Australia. It is an erect, compact shrub with hairy young branchlets, narrowly elliptic to narrowly egg-shaped leaves and erect, compact clusters of 4 to 12 white, bell-shaped flowers in upper leaf axils or on the ends of branches.

Description
The upper surface of the leaves is covered with short, white hairs and the lower surface is glabrous.

Taxonomy and naming
Leucopogon navicularis was first formally described in 2012 by Michael Clyde Hislop in the journal Nuytsia from specimens he collected near Dongara in 2011. The specific epithet (navicularis) means "boat-shaped", referring to the leaves.

Distribution and habitat
This leucopogon grows in disturbed heath and occurs in a small area north-wast of Dongara in the Geraldton Sandplains bioregion of southwestern Western Australia.

Conservation status
Leucopogon navicularis is listed as "Priority One" by the Government of Western Australia Department of Biodiversity, Conservation and Attractions, meaning that it is known from only one or a few locations which are potentially at risk.

References

navicularis
Ericales of Australia
Flora of Western Australia
Plants described in 2012